Malakkappara or Malakhappara is a small hill station in in Thrissur district of the state of Kerala, India. This place is situated on the border between Kerala and Tamil Nadu.

Etymology
The place gets its name from the Malayalam word Malakha-Para (മാലാഖപ്പാറ), meaning "Rock of the Angel", referring to a popular legend among Saint Thomas Christians of central Kerala.

Geography

The area consists of a tea estate owned by Tata Tea, forest area under the Kerala Forest Department belonging to both Vazhachal Forest Division and Malayattur Forest Division. Many endangered and endemic species of flora and fauna are found in the forests of Malakkappara area. It is situated at a distance of 86 km from Chalakudy along State Highway 21, passing through Thumboormuzhi, Athirappilly, Vazhachal, Sholayar. Malakkappara is 89 km away from Pollachi via Attakatti, Valparai, Solaiyar Dam etc.

References

External links 
Athirapally To Valparai

Villages in Thrissur district